Heindl is a surname. Notable people with the surname include:

 Bill Heindl Sr. (1922–1979), Canadian ice hockey player
 Bill Heindl Jr. (1946–1992), Canadian ice hockey player
 Elmer Heindl (1910–2006), U.S. Army chaplain
 Sebastian Heindl (born 1997), German organist

See also
 Heindel